The 5th Golden Melody Awards ceremony was held at the Sun Yat-sen Memorial Hall in Taipei on November 20, 1993.

References

External links
  5th Golden Melody Awards nominees
  

Golden Melody Awards
Golden Melody Awards
Golden Melody Awards
Golden Melody Awards